Chatfield may refer to:

Places
Chatfield, Arkansas
Chatfield, Minnesota
Chatfield, Ohio
Chatfield, Texas
Chatfield State Park, Colorado

Other uses
Chatfield (surname)